Eretis plistonicus, commonly known as the Ghana elf, is a species of butterfly in the family Hesperiidae. It is found in Guinea, Ivory Coast, Togo and Nigeria. The habitat consists of forest edges and secondary growth.

The larvae feed on Acanthaceae species.

References

Butterflies described in 1879
Celaenorrhinini
Butterflies of Africa